Melanie Benjamin (born November 24, 1962) is the pen name of American writer Melanie Hauser (née Miller).

Personal life 
Born November 24, 1962, in Indianapolis, Indiana, Melanie is one of three children. Melanie attended Indiana University--Purdue University at Indianapolis then married Dennis Hauser in 1988; they presently reside in the Chicago, Illinois area with their two sons. Melanie is a member of the Random House Speakers Bureau.

Publishing history 
As Melanie Hauser, she published short stories in the In Posse Review and The Adirondack Review. Her short story "Prodigy on Ice" won the 2001 "Now Hear This" short story competition that was part of a WBEZ (Chicago Public Radio) program called Stories on Stage, where short stories were performed and broadcast.

When Melanie sold her first of two contemporary novels, she had to add Lynne to her name (Melanie Lynne Hauser) to distinguish her from the published sports journalist Melanie Hauser. The first of Melanie's contemporary novels, Confessions of Super Mom was published with Dutton in 2005; the sequel Super Mom Saves the World was published by New American Library in 2007. In addition to her two contemporary novels, Melanie also contributed an essay to the anthology IT'S A BOY and maintained a popular mom blog called The Refrigerator Door.

Under the pen name Melanie Benjamin (a combination of her first name and her son's first name), she shifted genres to historical fiction. Her third novel, Alice I Have Been, was inspired by Alice Liddell Hargreaves's life. Published in 2010 by Delacorte Press, Alice I Have Been was a national bestseller and reached the extended list of The New York Times Best Seller list. In 2011, Benjamin fictionalized another historical female. Her novel The Autobiography of Mrs. Tom Thumb focuses on the life of Lavinia Warren Bump, a proportionate dwarf featured in P.T. Barnum's shows. Meredith Eaton optioned the film rights for The Autobiography of Mrs. Tom Thumb in December 2011.

Melanine Benjamin published a third historical fiction novel in 2013. The Aviator's Wife revolves around the historic personage of Anne Morrow Lindbergh. It was a New York Times bestseller in both hardcover and paperback. In addition it was a USA Today bestseller as well as an Indie Next List choice in both hardcover and paperback. The Aviator's Wife has been optioned for film by Vandalia Films, Jennifer Garner's production company.

Interviews 
The Diane Rehm Show

Book Trailers 
The Dutch Book Trailer for Alice I Have Been
Book Trailer for Mrs. Tom Thumb

See also
 Supermom

Bibliography
As Melanie Hauser:
 Confessions of Super Mom, (2005) 
 Super Mom Saves the World, (2007) 

As Melanie Benjamin:
 Alice I Have Been, (2010) 
 The Autobiography of Mrs. Tom Thumb, (2011) 
 The Aviator's Wife, (2013) 
 The Swans of Fifth Avenue, (2016) 
 Girls In The Picture, (2018) 
 Mistress of the Ritz, (2019) 
 The Children's Blizzard, (2021)

References

1962 births
Living people
American women writers
Indiana University–Purdue University Indianapolis alumni